Sharon Alida Maria Dijksma (born 16 April 1971) is a Dutch politician serving as Mayor of Utrecht since 2020. A member of the Labour Party (PvdA), she previously was a State Secretary at the Ministry of Education, Culture and Science from 2007 to 2010, at the Ministry of Economic Affairs from 2012 to 2015 and at the Ministry of Infrastructure and the Environment from 2015 to 2017, as well as an alderwoman of Amsterdam from 2018 until 2020.

Dijksma was the President of the Environment Council of the European Union who, together with the Vice-President of the European Commission Maroš Šefčovič, signed the Paris Agreement on behalf of Europe in New York on 21 April 2016.

Biography
She was a member of the House of Representatives from 23 March 2017 until 30 May 2018. From 3 November 2015 until 26 October 2017 she was the State secretary of the Ministry of Infrastructure and the Environment succeeding to Wilma Mansveld who resigned from the position; from 18 December 2012 to 3 November 2015 she was the State secretary of the Ministry of Economic Affairs, dealing with agriculture, nature, food quality, tourism, and postal affairs. Therefore, Dijksma was allowed to use the ministerial title "Minister for Agriculture" while on foreign business. Before that she was an MP from 17 June 2010 to 19 September 2012. She focused on matters of traffic, water management and home affairs.

Dijksma was the State secretary for Education, Culture and Science in the Fourth Balkenende cabinet from 2007 to 2010. From 1994 to 2007, she was a member of the House of Representatives. When, on 16 May 1994, Dijksma became an MP, her age was 23 and she was the youngest MP ever in Dutch parliamentarian history. In 1991 she became secretary general of the Young Socialists. From 1992 to 1994 she was chairwoman of the Young Socialists (Jonge Socialisten).

Dijksma studied law at the University of Groningen and public administration at the University of Twente but did not finish her studies.

Decorations

References

External links

Official
  S.A.M. (Sharon) Dijksma Parlement & Politiek

1971 births
Living people
20th-century Dutch politicians
20th-century Dutch women politicians
21st-century Dutch politicians
21st-century Dutch women politicians
Aldermen of Amsterdam
Knights of the Order of Orange-Nassau
Labour Party (Netherlands) politicians
Mayors of Utrecht
Members of the House of Representatives (Netherlands)
Politicians from Groningen (city)
State Secretaries for Economic Affairs of the Netherlands
State Secretaries for Education of the Netherlands
State Secretaries for Infrastructure of the Netherlands